The men's 800 metres event at the 2000 Asian Athletics Championships was held in Jakarta, Indonesia on 29–31 August.

Medalists

Results

Heats

Final

References

2000 Asian Athletics Championships
800 metres at the Asian Athletics Championships